VUA refers to Valorous Unit Award, a military honor. VUA may also refer to:

VU University Amsterdam
WVUA-FM, an Alabama college radio station
VUA, a band formed by Faith No More singer Chuck Mosley